Carlos Terrazas Sánchez (born 9 February 1962) is a Spanish football manager, currently in charge AD Hogar Alcarreño.

His career of over a quarter of a century was spent mostly in Segunda División B, though he also competed in Segunda División with Eibar, Guadalajara and Mirandés.

Football career
Born in Bilbao, Biscay, Terrazas began his managerial career at local CD Santurtzi, and subsequently worked with neighbouring Bilbao Athletic in Segunda División B. After spells with Gimnástica de Torrelavega, Burgos CF, Bilbao Athletic and AD Ceuta, he was appointed at the helm of Segunda División club SD Eibar in June 2005.

Terrazas was dismissed on 23 December 2005, after a bad run of results. In the summer of 2007, he moved to Real Jaén of the third division.

On 27 August 2009, Terrazas resigned from the Andalusians' bench, alleging personal problems. On 29 September of the following year he moved to CD Guadalajara, replacing the fired Kike Liñero. He achieved promotion to the second tier at the first attempt, and narrowly avoided relegation the following season, being appointed general manager in the process.

On 1 August 2013, after the Castilla-La Mancha side's administrative relegation, Terrazas announced his resignment. He joined fellow league team CD Mirandés on 17 December, replacing Gonzalo Arconada.

Terrazas remained in charge for the following campaigns, achieving an eighth place in 2014–15, the club's best-ever position. On 1 December 2016, he was relieved of his duties.

In 2017–18, Terrazas led SD Ponferradina for the whole season, also serving as sporting director. Though the aim was the play-offs, the team fought relegation and only avoided relegation in the penultimate game, finishing 12th; he did not renew his contract.

Managerial statistics

References

External links

1962 births
Living people
Sportspeople from Bilbao
Spanish football managers
Segunda División managers
Segunda División B managers
Tercera División managers
Tercera Federación managers
Athletic Bilbao B managers
Gimnástica de Torrelavega managers
Burgos CF managers
AD Ceuta managers
SD Eibar managers
Real Jaén managers
CD Guadalajara (Spain) managers
CD Mirandés managers
SD Ponferradina managers